Mount Bullion, California may refer to:

 Mount Bullion, Alpine County, California
 Mount Bullion, Mariposa County, California